Radio Preporod or Odžački Radio Preporod is a Bosnian local commercial radio station, broadcasting from Odžak, Bosnia and Herzegovina.

Radio Odžak was launched on 6 October 1997 by local company Radio Preporod d.o.o. Odžak. This radio station broadcasts a variety of programs such as news, music, morning and talk shows. Program is mainly produced in Bosnian language. The radio is also a sponsor of local cultural events, and popular programs are dedicated to the "Musini Dani" event, which is held in honor of the birth of prominent Bosnian poet Musa Ćazim Ćatić, who was born in Odžak.

Estimated number of potential listeners of Radio Preporod is around 50.742. Radiostation is also available in Bosanska Posavina area and in neighboring Croatia.

Frequencies
 Odžak

See also 
 List of radio stations in Bosnia and Herzegovina
 Radio postaja Odžak
 Radiopostaja Orašje

References

External links 
 www.fmscan.org
 www.radioodzak.com
 Communications Regulatory Agency of Bosnia and Herzegovina

Odžak
Odžak
Radio stations established in 1997